Pieter Coopse or Pieter Jansz. Coops (c. 1640–1673), was a Dutch Golden Age seascape painter and draughtsman from Hoorn in the Northern Netherlands.

According to the RKD (Rijksbureau voor Kunsthistorische Documentatie, a.k.a. Netherlands Institute for Art History'), he was a pupil of the seascape painter Ludolf Bakhuizen who resided at Hoorn in 1662–1663. He signed his name P.Coopse, sometimes with a second initial J for Jansz, but he seldom added a date. He painted marine subjects and landscapes, in the manner of Bakhuisen and Van de Velde, flourished about the year 1672. His pictures are generally of a small size, well composed, full of subject, and vigorously
painted. There is a picture by him in the Gallery at Munich, which is attributed to Bakhuisen in the catalogue, though the name may be discovered on
it: in England the dealers are more cautious; they remove it. Ploos van Amstel and others have given facsimiles of some of his drawings; but it is only recently that his own countrymen have discovered his merit as a painter in oil.

Notes

References

Attribution:
 

1640s births
1673 deaths
Dutch marine artists
Dutch Golden Age painters
Dutch male painters
People from Hoorn